Imperial River may refer to one of the following rivers:

In South America:

Imperial River (Chile)

In the United States:
Imperial River (Florida)

See also 
 Imperial (disambiguation)